The 2010 K3 League was the fourth season of amateur K3 League. The participating clubs were divided into two groups, and the winners and runners-up of both groups qualified for the championship playoffs. All clubs had interleague play once after playing home and away season in each group. Jeonju Ongoeul withdrew from the league, but Chuncheon FC and Yeonggwang FC joined the league.

Regular season

Group A

Group B

Championship playoffs

Bracket

Semi-finals

Final

Gyeongju Citizen won 1–0 on aggregate.

Final table

See also
2010 in South Korean football
2010 Korean FA Cup

References

External links

K3 League (2007–2019) seasons
2010 in South Korean football